Ossian Hall was an 18th-century plantation house in Annandale, Fairfax County, Virginia. Ossian Hall was one of three large residences, along with Oak Hill, and Ravensworth, owned by the Fitzhugh family in Fairfax County.

Location
Ossian Hall was located north of Braddock Road and east of the Capital Beltway (Interstate 495).

History
Ossian Hall was built on the Ravensworth land grant by Nicholas Fitzhugh, son of Henry Fitzhugh. In 1804, Dr. David Stuart, a commissioner for the Federal City, purchased Ossian Hall and relocated there with his wife, Eleanor Calvert Custis Stuart, and their children.

Francis Asbury Dickins, a Washington attorney, used the home as a summer residence until the outbreak of the Civil War, when it became his year-round residence.  All three of the Fitzhugh estates were protected by orders from both sides throughout the war.

Joseph L. Bristow, an American politician from Kansas, purchased Ossian Hall in 1918 and died there on July 14, 1944.

On September 3, 1959, Ossian Hall was burned as a training exercise for the Annandale Fire Department.

Image gallery

See also
Historic houses in Virginia

References

External links

Landmarks in Virginia
Historic American Buildings Survey in Virginia
Colonial architecture in Virginia
Houses in Fairfax County, Virginia
Fitzhugh family residences
Custis family residences
Annandale, Virginia
Plantation houses in Virginia
Burned houses in the United States
Buildings and structures demolished in 1959
1959 disestablishments in Virginia